The Great Venezuela Railway (Gran Ferrocarril de Venezuela) was a   railway from Caracas to Valencia. The railway was the longest in Venezuela. It proved difficult to recoup the initial investment and the railway became a notable cause of the Venezuelan crisis of 1902–1903. It fell into disrepair through the early 20th century and the last train ran in 1966.

Origin
Friedrich Krupp AG contracted with the Venezuelan government in 1888 to build the railway in exchange for £12,800 per kilometer to be repaid at 7 percent interest. Disconto-Gesellschaft financed the project; and terms were renegotiated at £11,000 per kilometer in 1891. The railway was completed in February 1894.

Description

The railway replaced a difficult carriage road through mountainous terrain. Contemporary accounts expressed great praise for the construction, which used Krupp steel railroad ties. 

The Caracas terminus was adjacent to the  gauge La Guaira and Caracas Railway to the coast, which operated until 1951. The Great Venezuela Railway entered the  Calvario tunnel for level grade to Antímano where a 2 percent climb began to a  summit in  Corozal tunnel  from Caracas. From Corozal tunnel the railway required 212 Krupp steel viaducts and 84 tunnels to cover  of gently descending grade across steep canyons to reach the fertile valley of Lake Valencia.
The Valencia terminus was at San Blas, but the line was eventually connected to the Puerto Cabello and Valencia Railway which had its own terminus at Camoruco.

By 1922 the railway had 18 locomotives, 30 passenger cars, 68 flatcars, and 20 stock cars. Although the 4-4-4T locos could reach , trains took 7 hours for the 179 km.

Financial difficulty
Early in the line's history it was adversely affected by political instability in Venezuela.
Krupp computed Venezuela's debt (including damages arising from the revolution against Venezuelan president Raimundo Andueza Palacio) as £1,900,000.  Suspension of debt payments by Cipriano Castro in 1901 was followed by the Venezuelan crisis of 1902–1903, a naval blockade involving gunboat diplomacy.

Museum 
The summit section of the railway forms part of a recreation park called Parque El Encanto (El Encanto is also the name of one of the stations). Work began in 2015 on a 350 million bolivar plan to restore  of track as a heritage railway, with 7 tunnels and 5 bridges, providing for a 25-minute journey from Los Lagos to El Encanto.

See also 
 Rail transport in Venezuela

References

External links 
Photobucket photos of the railway]
Parque El Encanto museum photos]

3 ft 6 in gauge railways in Venezuela